Kjøbenhavnsposten was a Danish oppositional newspaper founded by A. P. Liunge in 1827. The paper became the major media outlet for political Left Hegelianism in Denmark during the 1840s.

Viewpoints 
 was an oppositional newspaper that campaigned for a democratic constitution to replace the absolutist monarchy in Denmark. Even though the strict censorship rules had been somewhat slackened during the 1830s on account of the introduction of an estates general in Denmark, the laws against political propaganda against the government remained strict. A widely used method to circumvent the censorship laws was to employ "strawman" editors who were paid to receive the fines or jail sentences that followed the transgressions of the law. Another method was to use translations of foreign articles that dealt with matters that, even though seemingly about foreign affairs, could easily be applied to political conditions in Denmark. Such is the case with the article on the scan of this edition of the newspaper. The article is a concise version of a book review originally written in German by the journalist . Although the article is entirely about German affairs, there is no doubt that the message is aimed at the Danish political situation. Among other things, the note in connection with the headline conveys the information that Florencourt in the full version of the book review calls the book "traitorous" and "perfidious".

Publications 
One of Hans Christian Andersen's first poems,  (the dying child) was published in the newspaper on 25 September 1827.  would later on 13 May 1833 publish a parody of Hans Christian Andersen written by an anonymous author.

References

1827 establishments in Denmark
1859 disestablishments in Denmark
Danish-language newspapers
Defunct newspapers published in Denmark
Publications established in 1827
Publications disestablished in 1859
Newspapers published in Copenhagen